Events from the year 1693 in France

Incumbents
 Monarch – Louis XIV

Events
27 June – Battle of Lagos
29 July – Battle of Landen
4 October – Battle of Marsaglia

Births

Full date missing
Roland-Michel Barrin de La Galissonière, governor (died 1756)

Deaths

Full date missing
Roger de Rabutin, Comte de Bussy, memoirist (born 1618)
Jacques Rousseau, painter (born 1630)
Gabrielle de Rochechouart de Mortemart, noblewoman (born 1633)
Henri Justel, scholar and administrator (born 1620)
Paul Pellisson, writer (born 1624)
Marguerite de la Sablière, salonist and polymath (born c.1640)
Claude de Rouvroy, duc de Saint-Simon, courtier (born 1607)
François Duchesne, historian (born 1616)
François de Poilly, engraver (born 1623)

See also

References

1690s in France